Inishturk (Inis Toirc in Irish, meaning Wild Boar Island) is an inhabited island of County Mayo, in Ireland.

Geography 

Between Inisturk and Clare Island lies Caher Island. It has a permanent population of 58 people. There are two main settlements, both on the more sheltered eastern end of the island, Ballyheer and Garranty. Bellavaun and Craggy are abandoned settlements. The British built a Martello tower on the western coast during the Napoleonic Wars.

History 
Inishturk has been inhabited on and off since 4,000 BCE and has been inhabited permanently since at least 1700.
Some of the more recent inhabitants are descended from evacuees from Inishark to the southwest.

Recent history
In 1993, Inishturk Community centre was opened, this community centre doubles as a library and a pub. In June 2014 the ESB commissioned three new Broadcrown BCP 110-50 100kVA diesel generators to supply electricity to the island The ESB have operated a diesel power station on the island since the 1980s

Inishturk gained international attention in 2016 after a number of websites claimed that the island would welcome any American "refugees" fleeing a potential Donald Trump presidency. These were examples of the type of "fake news" that arose during the 2016 US presidential election campaign. 

The island is home to a primary school on the island which in 2011 had only 3 pupils; this is believed to be the smallest primary school in Ireland.

Demographics 
The table below reports data on Inisturk's population taken from Discover the Islands of Ireland (Alex Ritsema, Collins Press, 1999) and the Census of Ireland.

Transport 
Prior to 1997 there was no scheduled ferry service and people traveled to and from the islands using local fishing boats. Since then a ferry service operates from Roonagh Quay, Louisburgh, County Mayo.
The pier was constructed during the 1980s by the Irish government, around this time the roads on the island were paved.

Gallery

See also
Clare Island
Caher Island
Inishdalla
Inishbofin, County Galway
 List of islands of Ireland

References

External links
 
Podcast series on Mayo's Heritage, including a heritage Tour of Inishturk 
Mayo News - Inishturk islander committed to her community
Island life Inishbofin Inishturk
Irish Islands - Inishturk

Islands of County Mayo